An elimination reaction of free radicals is the mechanism by which free radicals can undergo an elimination reaction to form olefins. Such reactions are usually not major pathways for radical mediated reactions.

Reaction mechanisms
Radicals can undergo a disproportionation reaction through a radical elimination mechanism (See Fig. 1). Here a radical abstracts a hydrogen atom from another same radical to form two non-radical species: an alkane and an alkene.

Radicals can also undergo an elimination reaction to generate a new radical as the leaving group. For example, when polystyrene decomposes upon heating at a temperature above 300°C, a styrene monomer is generated via a radical elimination mechanism (See Fig. 2). Here, the new radical is generated on the polymer chain, which can further undergo a similar type of reaction to generate more styrene molecules. This process is known as the radical mediated depolymerization of polystyrene.

Radical elimination reactions are found in enzyme-catalyzed pathways. In the dehydrogenation reaction of acyl-CoA to form enoyl-CoA, FAD accepts two protons and two electrons to form FADH2 under the catalysis of acyl-CoA dehydrogenase.  The mechanism involves formation of acyl-CoA β-radical that undergo elimination to form the enoyl-CoA product (See Fig. 3).

References

Elimination reactions